Manavadar is one of the 182 Legislative Assembly constituencies of Gujarat state in India. It is part of Junagadh district.

List of segments

 Manavadar Taluka
 Vanthali Taluka
 Mendarda Taluka – Entire taluka except village – Lakadveri Nes

Member of legislative assembly
 2007 – Jawaharbhai Chavda, Indian National Congress
 2012 – Jawaharbhai Chavda, Indian National Congress
 2017 – Jawaharbhai Chavda, Indian National Congress
 2019 by-election – Jawaharbhai Chavda, Bharatiya Janata Party
 2022 – Arvindbhai Jinabhai Ladani, Indian National Congress

Election results

2022

2019 By-poll

2017

2012

See also
 List of constituencies of Gujarat Legislative Assembly
 Gujarat Legislative Assembly

References

External links
 

Assembly constituencies of Gujarat
Junagadh district